The 2019 Marsh One-Day Cup was the 51st season of the official List A domestic cricket competition in Australia. The tournament saw matches played in Perth, Brisbane, Adelaide, Melbourne, Sydney, Gold Coast, and Hobart. Fox Cricket broadcast thirteen matches from the tournament. The tournament was sponsored by Marsh & McLennan Companies, after previously being sponsored by Jardine Lloyd Thompson.

Western Australia won the tournament, after they beat Queensland by four wickets in the final.

Points table

RESULT POINTS:

 Win – 4
 Tie – 2 each
 No Result – 2 each
 Loss – 0
 Bonus Point – 1 (Run rate 1.25 times that of opposition.)
 Additional Bonus Point – 1 (Run rate twice that of opposition.)

Squads
The following squads were named:

Fixtures

Final

Statistics

Most runs

Most wickets

References

Marsh One-Day Cup
Australian domestic limited-overs cricket tournament seasons
Marsh One-Day Cup